The Treaty of Nagyvárad (or Treaty of Grosswardein) was a secret peace agreement between Emperor Ferdinand I and John Szapolyai, rival claimants to the Kingdom of Hungary, signed in Grosswardein / Várad (modern-day Oradea, Romania) on February 24, 1538. In the treaty, they divided Hungary between them.

Ferdinand recognized Zápolya as John I, King of Hungary and ruler of two-thirds of the Kingdom, while Zápolya conceded the rule of Ferdinand over western Hungary, and recognized him as heir to the Hungarian throne, since Zápolya was childless.

But in 1540, just before Zápolya's death, his wife bore him a son, John Sigismund Zápolya, and the agreement failed. John Sigismund was elected King of Hungary as John II by the Hungarian nobility. Ottoman Sultan Suleyman I, to whom John I had once sworn fealty, also recognized John II as King and his vassal. The struggle with Ferdinand and his successors resumed until 1571.

See also
List of treaties

References

Nagyvarad, Treaty of
Oradea
Nagyvarad
Nagyvarad
Principality of Transylvania (1570–1711)
1538 treaties
16th century in Hungary
1538 in the Habsburg monarchy
Eastern Hungarian Kingdom
Ferdinand I, Holy Roman Emperor